{{Speciesbox
| taxon = Conus damottai
| image =Conus damottai damottai 1.jpg
| image_caption = Apertural and abapertural views of shell of Conus damottai damottai Trovão, 1979
| status = LC
| status_system = IUCN3.1 
| status_ref = 
| authority = Trovão, 1979 
| synonyms_ref = 
| synonyms =
 Africonus damottai (Trovão, 1979)
 Africonus damottai damottai (Trovão, 1979)· accepted, alternate representation
 Africonus derrubado (Rolán & F. Fernandes, 1990)
 Africonus diegoi Cossignani, 2014
 Africonus pinedensis Cossignani & Fiadeiro, 2017 (original combination)
 Africonus purvisi Cossignani & Fiadeiro, 2017 (original combination)
 Africonus roquensis Cossignani & Fiadeiro, 2015
 Africonus umbelinae Cossignani & Fiadeiro, 2014
 Conus (Lautoconus) damottai Trovão, 1979· accepted, alternate representation
 Conus (Lautoconus) derrubado Rolán & F. Fernandes, 1990
 Conus (Lautoconus) diegoi (Cossignani, 2014)
 Conus damottai damottai Trovão, 1979
 Conus derrubado Rolán & Fernandes, 1990
 Conus diegoi (Cossignani, 2014)
| display_parents = 3
}}Conus damottai, common name the Glabrous cone, is a species of sea snail, a marine gastropod mollusk in the family Conidae, the cone snails and their allies.

Like all species within the genus Conus, these snails are predatory and venomous. They are capable of "stinging" humans, therefore live ones should be handled carefully or not at all.

There are two subspecies: 
 Conus damottai damottai Trovão, 1979: synonym of Conus damottai Trovão, 1979
 Conus damottai galeao Rolán, 1990: synonym of Conus galeao Rolán, 1990 (original rank)

Description
The size of an adult shell varies between 16 mm and 30 mm.

Distribution
This species occurs in the Cape Verde archipelago, Eastern Atlantic Ocean. The subspecies Conus damottai galeao is only found off the island of Maio (Baía do Galeão, Baía do Navio Quebrado); the subspecies Conus damottai damottai only off the island of Boa Vista.

References
 

 Filmer R.M. (2001). A Catalogue of Nomenclature and Taxonomy in the Living Conidae 1758 – 1998. Backhuys Publishers, Leiden. 388pp
 Rolán E., 2005. Malacological Fauna From The Cape Verde Archipelago. Part 1, Polyplacophora and Gastropoda Tucker J.K. (2009). Recent cone species database. September 4, 2009 Edition
 Cossignani T. & Fiadeiro R. (2015). Due nuovi coni da Capo Verde. Malacologia Mostra Mondiale. 87: 3-5 page(s): 5
 Cossignani T. & Fiadeiro R. (2017). Otto nuovi coni da Capo Verde''. Malacologia Mostra Mondiale. 94: 26–36.page(s): 27
  Puillandre N., Duda T.F., Meyer C., Olivera B.M. & Bouchet P. (2015). One, four or 100 genera? A new classification of the cone snails. Journal of Molluscan Studies. 81: 1–23

External links
 The Conus Biodiversity website
 
 Cone Shells – Knights of the Sea

damottai
Gastropods described in 1979
Gastropods of Cape Verde
Fauna of Maio, Cape Verde
Fauna of Boa Vista, Cape Verde